The discography of Italian rock band Måneskin consists of three studio albums, an extended play and fourteen singles. They have topped the Italian music charts on five occasions (with two singles and its three studio albums), and collected 34 platinum and seven gold certifications from FIMI, selling over two million records in Italy alone. 

After their victory at the Eurovision Song Contest 2021 with "Zitti e buoni", their releases entered numerous European and global weekly charts, and subsequently collected multiple international recording certifications. Among those certifications, "I Wanna Be Your Slave" and their cover of "Beggin'" were certified platinum by the BPI, and the former was also certified platinum and the latter triple platinum by the RIAA, totaling sales of over five million copies internationally.

Studio albums

Extended plays

Singles

As lead artist

As featured artist

Promotional singles

Other charted songs

Notes

References

Maneskin
Maneskin